Love Can't Wait is the debut album by American freestyle singer Lil Suzy. It was released on November 18, 1991, by High Power Records and distributed by Warlock Records. The album marks the beginning of her freestyle career with producer Tony "Dr. Edit" Garcia, president of High Power Records.  "Take Me in Your Arms" became the most successful single, reaching No. 67 on the Billboard Hot 100 chart. Later came the singles "Falling in Love" and "Love Can't Wait".

Track listing

References

Lil Suzy albums
1991 debut albums